Ferdinand Ries's Violin Sonata in D minor, Op. 83, was composed in Paris in 1808, the same year as the composer's violin sonata Op. 10 and the Op. 20 and Op. 21 cello sonatas.  The composition was not published, however, until 1818, after he had moved to London, in a simultaneous edition by both Clementi & Co and Chappell & Co. with a dedication to the "Princess Hatzfeld".

Structure

The sonata is in three movements:

 Allegro con brio
 Andantino con moto 
 Rondo: Allegro vivace 

Typical performances should take around 20 minutes.

References
Notes

Sources

External links
 

Violin sonatas by Ferdinand Ries
1808 compositions
Compositions in D minor
Music dedicated to nobility or royalty